Louis Boisot, Jr., (1856–1933) was an American lawyer and Vice President of the First Trust and Savings Bank of Chicago, Illinois. Boisot wrote the books By-laws of Private Corporations and A Treatise on the Law of Mechanics' Liens.

Early life

Louis Boisot was born in Dubuque, Iowa on May 23, 1856. He was the son of Louis Daniel Boisot (1823-1900) and Albertina Bush (1825-1889). Boisot graduated from Hamilton College (Iowa) in 1877 and belonged to Phi Beta Kappa society. He got his Bachelor of Laws at Columbia University in 1879 and was admitted to the bar in 1880.

Marriage and children

Boisot married Mary Spencer on May 13, 1887. He was a member of the La Grange Country Club in Illinois and a prominent churchman. They had two children.

Professional life

Boisot practiced law in Chicago from 1880 to 1903. The 1880 United States Census listed him as Attorney at law.

On March 26, 1904, Boisot was appointed the trust officer of the First National Bank of Chicago. On January 13, 1916, Boisot was appointed vive-president, keeping his title of trust officer. He was a director of three other Chicago banks and trustee of Rollins College. His brother Emile Kellogg Boisot was also a banker.

Boisot wrote two books on law, The Law of By-laws of Private Corporations (1892) and Treatise on the Law of Mechanics' Liens (1897). The latter book was reviewed where it was stated that "a considerable part of the Pennsylvania law, for example, as given by Mr. Boisot, is ancient history already." The review goes on to state: "As a digest of the law on Mechanic's Liens, as it existed at the time of writing, the work is of great value."

In 1922, he was a commissioner to the Presbyterian General Assembly.

Death
On July 23, 1933, Boisot died in Cape Elizabeth, Maine where he had a summer home. He was buried at the Rosehill Cemetery in Chicago, Cook County, Illinois. He was 77 years old.

Publications
 Supreme Court of Illinois. Patrick J. Sexton, Appellant, Chicago Storage Co. et al., Appellees in 1889, (Article)
 American Rights in the Behring Sea in 1890, Chicago, Illinois, (Article)
 The Legality of Trust Combinations in 1891, (Article)
 The Law of By-laws of Private Corporations First Edition (1892)
 By-laws of Private Corporations Second Edition (1902)
 A Treatise on  Mechanics' Liens in 1897
 Address on Corporation By-Laws in 1902 (Address)

References

External links
 

 

1856 births
1933 deaths
American bankers
People from Iowa